Dinizia excelsa is a South American canopy-emergent tropical rainforest tree species in the family Fabaceae, native to primarily Brazil and Guyana. In Portuguese it is known as angelim-vermelho, angelim, angelim-pedra, and paricá, or sometimes angelim-falso, faveira, faveira-dura, faveira-ferro or faveiro-do-grande. In Trio it is called awaraimë. In Wapisiana it is called parakwa.

Description
It is the tallest-growing species in the pea family, Fabaceae and one of the tallest tropical tree species in any family, reaching  and taller. The unarmed trunk is cylindrical, the bole of larger specimens 15–22.5 m, up to 3 m in diameter at soil level.

The heartwood is reddish brown with a slightly paler sapwood. The wood is durable and difficult to work with due to its density and irregular grain.

Distribution and habitat
It is found in Guyana, Suriname and Amazonia Brazil (in the northern and central-western states of Amapa, Amazonas, Mato Grosso, Para, Rondonia, Roraima and Tocantins). Also recorded from the state of Acre by Lorenzi (1992).

The species grows in non-inundated moist and upland mixed forests known as "floresta ombrofila mista", tropical forest on "terra firme", tropical upland evergreen forest, and tropical dry forest. It has been recorded at elevations from 50 to 490 m.

Tallest tree
The discovery was made using airborne laser scanning (ALS) and field verification in Paru State Forest, which is shared by the Brazilian Amazon basin states of Amapa and Para. On the 7th of October 2022 a group of researchers reached the tree and measured a circumference of 9.9 meters.

See also
 List of superlative trees#Tallest

References

Mimosoids
Trees of South America
Plants described in 1922
Taxa named by Adolpho Ducke